East End Baptist Church is a historic Baptist church building at 2609 Sixth Avenue South in Birmingham, Alabama.  It was built in 1947 in a style that can be described as Romanesque Revival, but has been well described by Jay Price as mid-century traditional. It added to the National Register of Historic Places in 2005. During the Civil Rights Movement it was led by the Reverend Calvin W. Woods.

References

African-American history in Birmingham, Alabama
Baptist churches in Alabama
National Register of Historic Places in Birmingham, Alabama
Renaissance Revival architecture in Alabama
Churches completed in 1947
Baptist churches in Birmingham, Alabama
Churches on the National Register of Historic Places in Alabama
1947 establishments in Alabama